Leptocladia is a genus of red algae known from the warm temperate eastern Pacific.

Species
Some species include:
L. binghamiae
L. binhamiae
L. laxa
L. peruviana

References

Dumontiaceae
Red algae genera